PHM Racing is a German auto racing team. The team started racing in the Italian Formula 4, ADAC Formula 4 and Formula 4 UAE championships in 2022. Currently the team competes in the Formula Regional Middle East Championship, Italian F4 Championship, and the Formula 4 UAE Championship. The team is due to take over Charouz Racing System's Formula 2 and Formula 3 entries in 2023.

History 
Born from the ashes of Mücke Motorsport, which disbanded its single-seater programme at the end of 2021, PHM Racing was founded by Paul Müller with a squad mostly consisting of former Mücke personnel and the aim of being a non-profit organization. The team made its first step into racing in the Formula 4 UAE Championship in 2022, competing with Nikita Bedrin, Jonas Ried and Taylor Barnard. Following a campaign that yielded the team's first ever race win with Barnard and a further pair of victories brought by Bedrin, team owner Paul Müller announced that they would be stepping into the Italian and German F4 series.

Current series results

Italian F4 Championship

Formula 4 UAE Championship

Formula Regional Middle East Championship

FIA Formula 2 Championship

In detail
(key) (Races in bold indicate pole position) (Races in italics indicate fastest lap)

FIA Formula 3 Championship

In detail
(key) (Races in bold indicate pole position) (Races in italics indicate fastest lap)

Former series results

ADAC Formula 4 Championship

Timeline

Notes

References

External links 

 

German auto racing teams
Auto racing teams established in 2022
2022 establishments in Germany
Sport in Berlin
FIA Formula 2 Championship teams
FIA Formula 3 Championship teams
Formula Regional teams